Strabena martini is a butterfly in the family Nymphalidae. It is found along the coast of Madagascar.

References

Strabena
Butterflies described in 1916
Endemic fauna of Madagascar
Butterflies of Africa
Taxa named by Charles Oberthür